The Russo-Georgian War included an extensive information war.

During the conflict
The Russian military attempted a few new steps to support an information campaign. Russian journalists were brought along with the Russian troops to report on the progress of the Russians in protecting its citizens and to propagandize Georgian atrocities. The Russians used television footage to gain psychological effects as well with the local population in the separatist regions. The Russians showed on local television footage of their advancing forces liberating the local Russian population. On the other hand, Georgia was unable to show any footage of its troops in action. The Russian government also used a military spokesman in television interviews to provide information on the conduct of the campaign, a first for Russia. 

Medvedev also said: "The form this aggression took is nothing less than genocide because Georgia committed heaviest crimes — civilians were torched, sawed to pieces and rolled over by tanks."

The Georgian government stopped broadcasting of Russian TV channels and blocked access to Russian websites, during the war and its aftermath, limiting news coverage in Georgia.

On 8–10 August 2008, RT aired several news reports about the war in Georgia. The reports started with the huge caption "GENOCIDE".

On 9 August 2008, Russian ambassador to Georgia Vyacheslav Kovalenko called the Georgian actions "the most true vandalism"."The city of Tskhinvali doesn't exist anymore. It simply doesn't. It was destroyed by the Georgian military," he claimed.

Sergei Ivanov was interviewed by CNN on 11 August 2008, saying that Georgia attacked South Ossetia instead of Russia attacking Georgia.

On 12 August 2008, RT accused CNN of presenting video footage of destruction in Tskhinvali in South Ossetia, shot by a Russian cameraman, as pictures of destruction in Gori.

Rest of August
The South Ossetians later claimed that 1,492 were killed as the result of the bombing of Tskhinvali.

On 14 August 2008, Russian Major-General Vyacheslav Borisov announced that the Russian troops would leave Gori 2 days later. The final withdrawal from Gori came 8 days after Borisov's announcement.

BBC News world affairs correspondent Paul Reynolds filed a story on 15 August, citing the reporting about refugee Ossetians in Russia and a Human Rights Watch report describing much of the damage in Tskhinvali as due to Georgian fire. According to him, "One problem for the Russians is that they have not yet learned how to play the media game." Reynolds called attention to the fact that most of the western media was based in Georgia. The cause of this, as he wrote, was Russia's reluctance to admit western media. He also wrote about how "mud" thrown had "stuck" to Russia and how the Bush administration was "trying to turn a failed military operation by Georgia into a successful diplomatic operation against Russia."

On 17 August 2008, The New York Times reported that while Russian authorities "have given Western journalists little or no access" to areas under its control, "Russian journalists are allowed to move around freely."

Malkhaz Gulashvili, President of The Georgian Times Media Holding, said: "Georgia has lost the information war since, unfortunately, foreign agencies frequently relied on Russian news sources controlled by the Kremlin. These would spread inaccurate news which foreign media had to reject later."

"I agree we lost the information war in the first few days, but we have nothing to hide here," Russian Defence Ministry spokesman Andrei Klyuchnikov told the journalists on 19 August.

On 20 August, the Russian Investigative Committee reported that they had confirmed 133 civilian deaths. "Perhaps in a while we will reach the figure that is given by the South Ossetian authorities," one representative said. When asked about the Georgian deaths, the representative said that this issue was not their concern. However, nine days later, prime minister Vladimir Putin still said in an interview with German ARD TV that 2,000 Russian civilians were killed during the conflict. Putin also said: "And if we protect our lives, then a sausage will be taken away from us? What choice do we have - between life and sausage?" He said about Georgia that "the aggressor was punched in the face".

Der Spiegel was accused by one of its staff members, Pavel Kassin, of propaganda and taking a pro-American stance. Izvestia claimed that this was influenced by the ousting earlier in 2008 of the editor-in-chief Stefan Aust, who had worked for many years in Der Spiegel, and his replacement with Georg Mascolo who had been leading the Washington subdivision of the magazine.

South Ossetian envoy to Russia Dmitry Medoyev [falsely] claimed in an interview that "They started the war with the fact that the Georgian peacekeeping battalion fixedly shot in the back of the Russian soldiers. Same peacekeepers, like they [the Georgians] were. Wearing the same uniform. And they had the same command, but they [the Georgians] brought them forward and shot them all in the back." He also claimed that the Georgian soldiers were under the influence of "100% American made psychotropic drugs".

Russia alleged that an American citizen fought with Georgian forces. Deputy Chief of the General Staff Anatoly Nogovitsyn displayed photocopies of an American passport at a news briefing, claiming that the passport was found at a Georgian fighting position. The passport owner and U.S. authorities denied the accusation, saying that his passport was lost elsewhere.

During the war, the Radio station Echo of Moscow broadcast balanced accounts on a show called "With Their Own Eyes." On 29 August 2008, Prime minister Putin gathered thirty-five leading media executives in Sochi. Putin paid attention to Aleksei Venediktov, the editor-in-chief of Echo of Moscow, and criticized the station for its coverage of the war.

After the war
In early September 2008, the German newspaper Der Spiegel published an article saying that internal reports from the OSCE effectively blamed Georgia for the war. OSCE spokesperson Martin Nesirky subsequently denied this accusation. 

On 5 September 2008, the head of the Russian Investigative Committee reported that they managed to confirm only 134 civilian deaths. On 4 July 2009, this figure was revised up to 162.

Temur Iakobashvili, the Georgian minister, said that there was an ongoing "information war" for international public opinion. He accused Russia of spending a lot of money on a propaganda campaign to alter the opinion that Russian forces invaded and occupied Georgia.

In November 2008, Alexander Bastrykin, Chairman of the Investigative Committee of the Prosecutor General's Office, [falsely] claimed that during the war South Ossetia was invaded by mercenaries from United States, Czech Republic, Turkey, Ukraine and Chechnya.

Mark Ames asserted in December 2008, that the reporting of The New York Times was biased towards Georgia.

Human Rights Watch called the Russian death toll figure of 2,000 unfounded. 

Human Rights Watch also stated that it "does not have the capacity to make a definitive estimate as to the number of civilian casualties." But they cited different investigative groups, which provided numbers between 162 civilian and 300-400 total casualties. Russia and South Ossetia were unable to explain how the calculation of claims of up to 2,000 victims was carried out. This initial claim also significantly influenced public sentiment in South Ossetia and bitterness toward Georgians.

In March 2009, Lenta.ru published an interview with Russian journalist Vadim Rechkalov. Rechkalov arrived in Tskhinvali during the war. He said that Russian BM-21 Grads shelled Tskhinvali. He also said that he found out on 13 August 2008 that rumors about "total destruction" of Tskhinvali were false.

According to political scientist Svante Cornell, Moscow spent millions in a public-relations campaign to convince the world that Georgia, not Russia, began the war (despite abundant evidence, including some in Russian media, to the contrary).

In August 2009, BBC reported that analysts said the propaganda war was still active as both sides sought "to gain the moral high ground".

Nicolai N. Petro, Professor of Politics at the University of Rhode Island, claimed that Western media coverage of the war was biased at first, but became more balanced in November, 2008, when two OSCE officials Ryan Grist and Stephen Young confirmed the Russian version of events — that the Georgian attack was unprovoked and indiscriminate. Professor Petro said that initial impressions conveyed by respected news outlets tend to linger on, even if the story later changes radically, and "it is therefore not surprising that American pundits and politicians continue to refer to the events of last August as “Russian aggression,” even though subsequent reporting has debunked this as a myth."

In March 2010, it was reported that the Russian Investigative Committee of the Prosecutor's Office [falsely] claimed that they had the evidence of mercenaries from UNA-UNSO fighting alongside the Georgians. According to the investigators, the Ukrainian mercenaries were recruited and financially supported by the Ministry of Internal Affairs of Georgia.

Former Moscow correspondent of The Guardian Luke Harding wrote in his book Mafia State that Russian state-controlled media failed to mention the ethnic cleansing of Georgians in South Ossetia and the focus was solely on the martyrdom of the South Ossetians. He also noted that the ethnic cleansing of Georgians looked more like a systemic attempt to drive out Georgians and redraw the map of Georgia rather than revenge. According to him, the Kremlin launched a "furious attack" on foreign journalists and intimated that they were, in reality, agents of the CIA. The Kremlin kept the foreign journalists away from ethnic Georgian villages inside South Ossetia. American and British journalists were not allowed to travel independently inside South Ossetia. He reported that on 25 November 2008, when he went to the press department of the Russian Foreign Ministry to renew his accreditation, the official who spoke to him was furious about his reporting and asked him repeatedly if he, his wife, or his family were not “worried that something might happen” to him if he stayed in Russia.

In 2012, the Russian Investigative Committee of the Prosecutor's Office was still conducting investigation on the events in South Ossetia. The Committee [falsely] claimed that they confirmed the attempts to discredit the Russian military. According to them, before the Russians entered Gori, Ukrainian mercenaries were dressed as the Russian troops and participated in the making of photo and video footage that showed the attacks on civilians and looting in the Georgian villages.

In early 2014, the book Putin's Wars: The Rise of Russia's New Imperialism was published that offered the first systematic analysis of the war in the wider historical context. The author examined the Russian wartime propaganda and explained how the Russian propaganda transformed the victim (Georgia) into aggressor.

The Secrets Of Russia's Propaganda Machine
Inside RT: News Network or Putin Propaganda?
Russia's Online Troll Army Is Huge, Hilarious & Already Everywhere
Russian Lessons clip - Media Manipulation
 Andrei Illarionov's analysis of the origin of Der Spiegel's fabricated fact
 Andrei Illarionov's criticism of Uwe Klussman and Der Spiegel

See also
 Psychological operations (Russia)

References

Russo-Georgian War
Information operations and warfare
Psychological warfare techniques
Propaganda techniques using information